Mesothyatira is a monotypic moth genus in the family Drepanidae described by Werny in 1966. Its only species, Mesothyatira simplificata, was described by Constant Vincent Houlbert in 1921. It is found in the Chinese provinces of Shaanxi, Sichuan and Yunnan.

References

Moths described in 1921
Thyatirinae
Monotypic moth genera
Moths of Asia
Drepanidae genera